Vieraea is a genus of Canary Island plants in the tribe Inuleae within the family Asteraceae.

Species
The only known species is Vieraea laevigata, native to Tenerife Island.

References

Monotypic Asteraceae genera
Inuleae
Flora of the Canary Islands